The Freedom Bowl featured the San Diego State Aztecs and the Tulsa Golden Hurricane as their postseason bowl game to end the 1991 NCAA Division I-A football season for both teams.

Background
While the Aztecs finished second in the Western Athletic Conference, they were invited to their first bowl game since the 1986 Holiday Bowl. They were led by Marshall Faulk, who in his freshman year ran for 1,429 yards rushing and scored 23 total touchdowns. Meanwhile, this was Tulsa's 2nd bowl appearance in three seasons.

Game summary
Ron Jackson scored all of Tulsa's touchdowns four in total with three of them giving Tulsa the lead and the final being the exclamation point. He rushed for 211 yards on 46 carries. Faulk gave the Aztecs the lead with a touchdown run, though Tulsa responded with by scoring two straight touchdown runs by Jackson. Lowery made the game tied at halftime with a touchdown run. But the Aztecs were stuffed in the second half, being held to a field goal with 83 total yards as Tulsa scored twice more and never looked back. A key moment in the game happened when quarterback/punter Gus Frerotte punted the ball to T. C. Wright with Tulsa leading 21–17. Wright was at his own eight when he fumbled the ball, and Billy Cole recovered for Tulsa. Two plays later, the Hurricane scored on Jackson's final touchdown to give Tulsa their first bowl win since 1964.

Aftermath
The Hurricane went into a slump from that point on, going 26–57–1 under Rader in the eight years after the game before being fired, in contrast to his 26–26 record before this game. The Freedom Bowl would play three more games before disbanding after 1994.

Statistics

References

Freedom Bowl
Freedom Bowl
San Diego State Aztecs football bowl games
Tulsa Golden Hurricane football bowl games
Freedom Bowl
Freedom Bowl